Baltimore Hundred is a hundred in the southeastern section of Sussex County, Delaware, United States. Baltimore Hundred was formed in 1775 from Worcester County, Maryland. Its primary community is Millville. The old colonial term "hundred" is used to describe a sectioned area of the county in which 100 farms should fit. The Hundred was home to 3 villages, Selbyville, Roxanna and Ocean View.

References

Hundreds in Sussex County, Delaware